Maccabi Ahi Nazareth Football Club (Mo'adon Kaduregel Maccabi Aḥi Natzrat; , Nade Korat Alqadam Maccabi Ekhaa Al-Nasera) is an Israeli football club based in Nazareth.

History
The club was formed in 1968, and played in Liga Gimel until 1975. In 1998 they were promoted to Liga Artzit (then the second tier), finishing eighth in the league. In 1999–2000 and 2000–01 they finished one place above the relegation zone.

The 2002–03 season saw the club claim the Liga Leumit title, despite being deducted three points for playing an ineligible player, under the leadership of Azmi Nassar. They were promoted to the Israeli Premier League for the first time in their history. Fellow Israeli Arab club Bnei Sakhnin were also promoted, marking the first time two Arab clubs had been in the top division.

However, in their first season in the top division, the club finished bottom and were relegated back to Liga Leumit. The following season they were relegated again (due to a two-point deduction), and dropped back into the third division. In 2005–06 they finished as Liga Artzit runners-up, to make an immediate return to Liga Leumit, where they have remained since.

In 2008–09, the club was promoted to the Israeli Premier League.

After one of the worst seasons in the Israeli Premier League the club finished in the last spot of the league, In the last match she lost to Hapoel Ramat Gan 0–7 and were directly relegated to Liga Leumit for the 2010–11 season.

In the 2014–15 Israel State Cup, the club reached the Semi-finals for the first time in their history, after eliminating Maccabi Netanya, F.C. Ashdod and Hapoel Kfar Saba. However, in the Semi-finals, they were beaten 0–3 by the eventual cup winners, Maccabi Tel Aviv in Teddy Stadium, Jerusalem.

Current squad
As of 13 June 2022.

Past managers
 Azmi Nassar
 Yehoshua Feigenbaum
 Michael Kadosh
 Eli Mahpud
 John Gregory
 Adham Hadiya
 Motti Ivanir
 Shlomi Dora
 Tal Banin

Honours
Liga Alef:
Winners (1): 1997–98
Liga Leumit:
Winners (1): 2002–03
Liga Artzit:
Runners-up (1): 2005–06

External links
Maccabi Ahi Nazareth Israel Football Association 

 
Sport in Nazareth
Ahi Nazareth F.C.
Ahi Nazareth F.C.
Association football clubs established in 1967
1967 establishments in Israel
Arab-Israeli football clubs